TVP3 Rzeszów is one of the regional branches of the TVP, Poland's public television broadcaster. It serves the entire Podkarpackie Voivodeship.

External links 
Official website

Telewizja Polska
Television channels and stations established in 1990
1990 establishments in Poland
Mass media in Rzeszów